The 1936 Army Cadets football team represented the United States Military Academy in the 1936 college football season. In their fourth year under head coach Garrison H. Davidson, the Cadets compiled a 6–3 record and outscored their opponents by a combined total of 238 to 71.  In the annual Army–Navy Game, the Cadets lost to the Midshipmen by a 7 to 0 score. The Cadets' other two losses came against Colgate and Notre Dame. 
 
No Army players were recognized on the 1936 College Football All-America Team.

Schedule

References

Army
Army Black Knights football seasons
Army Cadets football